Asia is the debut studio album by English rock supergroup Asia, released in 1982. According to both Billboard and Cashbox, it was the #1 album in the United States for the year 1982. It contains their biggest hit "Heat of the Moment", which reached #4 in the US on the Billboard Hot 100 chart.

Recording

Asia included keyboardist Geoffrey Downes and guitarist Steve Howe from Yes; King Crimson singer-bassist John Wetton, and Emerson, Lake & Palmer drummer Carl Palmer.

"The production was a bit Journey-esque," Howe noted. "That was down to Mike Stone, who’d co-produced Escape, which was a huge album for Journey. But ‘Heat of the Moment’ was the last song we recorded for the Asia album. By then we’d already done stuff like ‘Time Again’ and ‘Wildest Dreams,’ which were very progressive. There was also this sweetness in ‘[Only] Time Will Tell.’ But as soon as I stacked up the guitar and John started singing, we knew we had something special in ‘Heat of the Moment’.”

"People said, 'No, that's not going to work. It's all keyboards now. It's all synthesizers.' I think A Flock of Seagulls was No. 1," Wetton commented. "Actually, what we did was make a sound that blew synthesizers out of the water. Everyone said, 'Oh, no, no, no. A prog-guitar band ain't gonna work.' But it did."

Artwork
Asia's logo and cover artwork were created by Roger Dean, known for his work with Yes (of which guitarist Steve Howe and keyboard player Geoff Downes were previous members) and Uriah Heep (of which bassist/vocalist John Wetton had previously been a member). The debut album's art depicts a sea serpent gazing into a crystal orb. 

There was a concern that having Dean do the cover would produce something that looked too much like his famed artwork for Yes, but Howe and Downes pushed for his involvement. Geffen's John Kalodner did not initially like Dean's logo for the band.

Critical reception

Robert Christgau blasted the album, and particularly its lyrics. He stated that it had been a rare occasion that "a big new group is bad enough to sink your teeth into any more" and called the album "pompous – schlock in the grand manner". Melody Maker'''s Adam Sweeting similarly lambasted the band: "Designed by computer, hand-built by robots...Completely calculated, thoroughly contemptible, Asia is very bit as hollow, shallow and nasty as anyone had a right to expect." On the other side, in a Billboard review, it was favourably noted that "the caliber of the [band's] playing is superb and the music sounds fresh and perfect fare for AOR". 

In a retrospective review for AllMusic, Tom Demalon awarded Asia four-and-a-half out of five, saying that "there's no denying the epic grandeur of the music, which provided some much-needed muscle to radio at the time, and did so with style".

Commercial performance
Upon its release in March 1982, Asia reached #1 in the US and spent nine weeks at the top of the Billboard album chart. Asia was certified 4x-platinum in the US by the RIAA on 10 February 1995. It was the best-selling album of 1982 in the US.

In the band's native UK, Asia did not perform as well as in the US, peaking only at #11 and spent a total of 38 weeks in the UK Albums Chart. The record received a gold status in Britain on 18 October 1982. "Heat of the Moment" climbed to No. 46.Asia'''s total worldwide sales are estimated at over ten million copies.

Aftermath
“It was really most unlikely that musicians who derived from ’70s bands would come out and be the pinup boys on MTV and People magazine and all that kind of stuff .... There was a difference between the Yes and Asia audiences to some degree, because Asia was such a big thing across America to all age groups.” Downes said. “Yes’ following is really quite eclectic — it’s a big following of course, but with Asia, teenage girls would be into it and stuff like that. It’s an interesting combination for me, because having been with both bands and still at it, it’s nice to get that whole cross section of people following the music.”

2010 Audio Fidelity remastered edition
In 2010, Audio Fidelity released a 24 Karat Gold CD (AFZ 068) remaster of the album, mastered by Kevin Gray.

Track listing

Personnel

Asia
John Wetton – lead vocal, bass guitar
Geoff Downes – keyboard, vocals
Steve Howe – guitars, vocals
Carl Palmer – drums, percussion

Technical personnel
Mike Stone – producer, engineer
Roger Dean – cover design
Brian Griffin – inner sleeve photography

Charts

Weekly charts

Year-end charts

All-time chart

Certifications

References

External links
 The official Asia web site

Asia (band) albums
1982 debut albums
Geffen Records albums
Albums produced by Mike Stone (record producer)
Albums with cover art by Roger Dean (artist)